Carlos Daniel "Lobo" Cordone (born 6 January 1974), is a former Argentine professional football player who played as a striker.

Cordone started his career at Vélez Sársfield and played there for six seasons before moving to Racing Club de Avellaneda in 2000. Later that year he moved to Newcastle United for a fee of £500,000, but failed to meet expectations at Newcastle and only played for the club for one season. He scored three goals, against Derby County, Tottenham Hotspur and Bradford City in the League Cup.

In 2001, he returned to Argentina to play for Argentinos Juniors. After one season with them he moved to San Lorenzo where he helped the club to win the Copa Sudamericana in 2002.

Towards the end of his career he has played for Argentino de Merlo in the Metropolitan 4th division and Independiente Rivadavia in the 3rd division Interior.

References

External links
 Argentine Primera stats at Futbol XXI

1974 births
People from General Rodríguez Partido
Argentine footballers
Club Atlético Vélez Sarsfield footballers
Racing Club de Avellaneda footballers
Argentinos Juniors footballers
San Lorenzo de Almagro footballers
Independiente Rivadavia footballers
Premier League players
Association football forwards
Living people
Newcastle United F.C. players
Argentine Primera División players
Argentine expatriate footballers
Expatriate footballers in England
Argentino de Merlo footballers
Sportspeople from Buenos Aires Province
Doping cases in association football